Viceregal (April 4, 1966 – 1984) was a Canadian Champion Thoroughbred racehorse who was voted Canadian Horse of the Year as a two-year-old.

Background
Bred and raced by E. P. Taylor and his Windfields Farm, he was a first-crop son of the great Northern Dancer and out of the Windfields-owned mare, Victoria Regina. Viceregal was conditioned for racing by Gordon J. "Pete" McCann.

Racing career
He was sent to race at age two in 1968, and although the colt suffered from soundness problems, he nonetheless won all eight of his starts and won Canadian Horse of the Year honors. Popular with racing fans because of his come-from-behind style, of his eight wins, seven were stakes races including the two most important races for juveniles in Canada, the Coronation Futurity Stakes and the Cup and Saucer Stakes.

Targeted towards the 1969 Kentucky Derby, Viceregal was sent to race in the United States but on his first start in a minor race at Lexington he pulled up injured after finishing third. It was discovered that he had broken a bone in a forefoot thereby ending his racing career.

Stud record
Retired to stud, Viceregal stood at Windfields Farm in Ontario as well as at breeding operations in Germany, France and Japan. In all, he sired thirty-five stakes race winners and is the damsire of the 1987 Prix de l'Arc de Triomphe winner, Trempolino.

Pedigree

References

1966 racehorse births
1984 racehorse deaths
Racehorses bred in Canada
Racehorses trained in Canada
Canadian Champion racehorses
Canadian Thoroughbred Horse of the Year
Thoroughbred family 10-c